Louise of Lorraine (30 April 1553 – 29 January 1601) was Queen of France as the wife of King Henry III from their marriage on 15 February 1575 until his death on 2 August 1589. During the first three months of their marriage, she was also Queen of Poland and Grand Duchess of Lithuania. As a dowager queen, Louise held the title of Duchess of Berry.

Personal life

Early years

Born in Nomeny in the Duchy of Bar, Louise was the third daughter and youngest child born to Nicholas of Lorraine, Duke of Mercœur, and Countess Margaret of Egmont (1517–1554). She was the only surviving child of her parents; her older siblings, two sisters and one brother, died in infancy.

Louise's mother died shortly before her first birthday in 1554, and her father quickly remarried, in 1555, Princess Joanna of Savoy-Nemours (1532–1568), and gave Louise a solid classical education and introduced her to Nancy's court at the age of ten. Joanna of Savoy-Nemours died in 1568 and Louise's father contracted his third and last marriage in 1569 with Princess Catherine of Lorraine-Aumale (1550–1606).

At the age of 20, Louise was described as a beautiful and delicate tall, blonde girl with a white complexion, light brown eyes (veiled by a slight myopia), with a slender and refined silhouette. Her upbringing reportedly resulted in her personality being quiet, dutiful and pious.

The marriage proposal of Henry III
Louise would first meet Henry in the autumn of 1573, when Henry, Duke of Anjou, was on his way to Krakow, the capital of his new kingdom, Poland-Lithuania. She attracted Henry's interest during a celebration in honor of Henry's election as King of Poland-Lithuania .

Following the death of Charles IX of France, Henry of Poland-Lithuania succeeded him under the name of Henry III of France and returned clandestinely to France. Louise was with her family traveling to Reims for Henry's coronation, when Philippe Hurault de Cheverny and Michel Du Guast arrived to make Henry's marriage proposal.

Queen 

Louise and Henry's wedding  took place at the Cathedral of Reims in a ceremony celebrated by Charles, Cardinal de Bourbon two days after Henry's coronation, 15 February 1575. At the end of the month, the new Queen of France made her official entry to Paris with her husband.

Described as a "sweet and virtuous" young woman, Louise reportedly immediately and deeply fell in love with her husband, a feeling that never changed, despite the difficulties, tragedies, his infidelities and finally death. Being a pious and very simple person, she is said to have suffered terribly because of the conflicts between her family (the Houses of Guise and Lorraine and in particular between her brother Philippe Emmanuel, Duke of Mercœur) and her husband during the Wars of Religion.

Thanks to her calm personality, Louise duly accepted her husband's eccentricities: for example, Henry III loved to dress her in elegant dresses and made her into something of a fashion doll; she readily accepted this because she was happy for his attention. Coming from a simple upbringing in the country, Louise was given Jeanne de Dampierre as Première dame d'honneur to guide her in court protocol and manners, and Louise de la Béraudière as Dame d'atour to guide her in fashion and appearance to make her a Queen consort able to meet Henry III's idea of presentation, and they were both reported to have succeeded very well with their task. The King's interest in pampering Louise was used by his enemies against him; he was called "Hair-dresser to his Wife" in a libelous pamphlet.

The marriage did not produce children — apparently Louise was pregnant at the beginning of her marriage, but had a miscarriage in May 1575; however this is an unconfirmed rumor, as no pregnancy was ever officially announced. The Queen blamed herself for this and as a result became thin, suffering bouts of depression. Between 1579 and 1586, both she and her husband made numerous pious offerings and pilgrimages, especially to Chartres and spa treatments in the hope of having an heir. As a result, the heir presumptive was (after the death of the King's brother Francis, Duke of Anjou in 1584) the controversial Henry III of Navarre, a fact which placed additional pressure upon both Louise and her husband.  In 1584, there were rumors that Henry III would divorce her, but they proved to be untrue.  According to Brantôme, Louise was at one point advised by a lady-in-waiting, that because her marriage would not result in children, it would be wise to use a different method to accomplish this (referring to another biological father), but the Queen took deep offense at this advice and refused to listen.

As Queen consort, Louise was given a great representational role by Henry and often in his company, participating in ceremonies, parties, and receptions at his side, and performing representational tasks, such at the opening session of the Estates General and when she placed the foundation stone to Pont Neuf with her husband on 31 May 1578. She was never involved in state affairs except in a purely ceremonial sense: she attended the Council of the King, received ambassadors in her own chambers, and officiated over the opening of parliament when it was required that she perform such tasks for ceremonial reasons, but she never used these tasks to actually participate in politics.

Louise was popular among the public for her beauty and charitable personality. Due to this popularity, in 1588 she proved a moral symbolic support for the royal cause when she remained in Paris with her mother-in-law after the King had fled from the capital during his conflict with the Duke of Guise.

Queen Dowager

After the assassination of her husband by the Dominican Jacques Clément on 1 August 1589, Louise fell into a state of permanent depression and began to dress in white, the traditional mourning colour of French queens, being nicknamed the "White Queen".  As a dower land, she received the Duchy of Berry during her lifetime. She was working to rehabilitate the memory of her husband, who had been excommunicated after the assassination of the Cardinal of Guise. On 6 September 1589, barely a month after the death of her husband, Louise asked Henry IV to clear her late husband's name, and on 20 January 1594, she officially demanded the rehabilitation of Henry III at a ceremony in Nantes.

Following her husband's death and for the next 11 years, Louise lived at the Château de Chenonceau, which she received as inheritance from her mother-in-law; she installed her room on the second floor, and she covered the walls with black. The decor was rather somber with the attributes ordinarily reserved for mourning: crosses, shovels and tips of the burial, cornucopia shedding tears. This black and silver decoration was reproduced on the curtains of the bed and the windows. But the castle being mired in debts and having not itself a huge pension, she bequeathed it to her niece Françoise of Lorraine, the only surviving child and heiress of her brother, who later married César de Bourbon, Duke of Vendôme (illegitimate son of King Henri IV and Gabrielle d'Estrées).

Louise died in the Château de Moulins in Moulins, Allier on 29 January 1601 and all her property was distributed or used to pay her debts. In September 1603, a papal bull ordered the construction of a Convent of Capuchins in Paris to bury her, which was done on 20 March 1608. Her remains, found in October 1805, are located since 1817 in the royal crypt of Saint Denis Basilica. She was the only Queen consort prior to the French Revolution to actually be buried in a tomb bearing her name in Saint-Denis.

Ancestry

References

Additional sources 

1553 births
1601 deaths
People from Meurthe-et-Moselle
French queens consort
Dauphines of Viennois
House of Lorraine
House of Valois
Princesses of Lorraine
16th-century French people
17th-century French people
Henry III of France
Burials at the Basilica of Saint-Denis
Royal reburials